The 2017–18 UConn Huskies women's basketball team represented the University of Connecticut (UConn) during the 2017–18 NCAA Division I women's basketball season. The Huskies, led by Hall of Fame head coach Geno Auriemma, in his 33rd season at UConn, played their home games at Harry A. Gampel Pavilion and the XL Center and were fifth-year members of the American Athletic Conference. They finished the season 36–1, 16–0 in AAC play to win the AAC regular season championship. They defeated Tulane, Cincinnati, and South Florida to win the AAC women's tournament title. As a result, they received the conference's automatic bid to the NCAA women's tournament. As the overall No. 1 seed, they defeated Saint Francis (PA) and Quinnipiac to advance to the Sweet Sixteen. They defeated Duke in the Sweet Sixteen and South Carolina in the Elite Eight to reach their 19th Final Four. In the National Semifinal, they lost in overtime on a last second shot for the second consecutive year, this time to Notre Dame, ending the school's 36-game winning streak.

Previous season 
The Huskies finished the 2016–17 season 36–1, 16–0 in AAC play to win the AAC regular season championship. They defeated Tulsa, UCF, and South Florida to win the AAC women's tournament championship. As a result, they received the conference's automatic bid to the NCAA women's tournament. As the overall No. 1 seed, they defeated Albany and Syracuse to advance to the Sweet Sixteen. In the Sweet Sixteen, they defeated UCLA to advance to the Elite Eight where they defeated Oregon. In the National Semifinal, they lost in overtime to Mississippi State, ending the school's 111-game winning streak.

Offseason

Departures

Recruiting class

FIBA 
Kia Nurse participated on the Canada women's national basketball team in the 2017 FIBA Women's AmeriCup event. This is a tournament that takes place every other year between the national teams of the two continents. It also serves as a qualifying tournament for the Olympic games. In the gold-medal game against the host team Argentina, the Canadians were behind by seven points at halftime but they came back in the second half, Nurse had a basket with just over a minute left to give Canada the lead for good and the gold-medal.

FIBA U19 
Megan Walker, Crystal Dangerfield, and Christyn Williams (Central Arkansas Christian Schools, with a verbal commitment to Connecticut) all participated on the United States women's national under-19 basketball team which competed in the FIBA Under-19 Women's Basketball World Cup, held in Udine, Italy in July. The USA team faced an undefeated Russia in the gold medal game, but fell short, losing 86–82. Dangerfield scored 15 points in the final, which resulted in the silver medal for the USA. For the entire event, Dangerfield averaged 9.0 points per game, Walker averaged 7.6 and Williams averaged 3.2.

3x3 U18 
Christyn Williams was one of four players selected to represent the US in the FIBA 3x3 U18 World Cup held in Chengdu, China in June and July. Williams scored 22 points over the course of the seven games to help the USA win all seven games, including the gold-medal game against the Czech Republic.

Roster

Andra Espinoza-Hunter was only on the roster for the fall semester, after which she transferred from UConn.

Game summaries

Exhibition

Netherlands National Team 
The UConn team took a trip to Italy in August, interspersing visits to historical sites with exhibition games against Dutch, Italian and Slovenian basketball teams. The first game was against the Netherlands national team on 14 August 2017 in Rome, Italy. Collier led the team in points and rebounds with 16 and 11 respectively helping UConn to a 68–52 in over the national team. Nurse was not present for that game as she was still playing for the Canadian national team in the FIBA AmeriCup tournament.

The next day, the two teams faced off again. Nurse was present for this game and contributed 18 points, although high-scoring honors went to her teammate Samuelson with 23 points. UConn won the game 88–66.

Italian All-stars 
Three days later, UConn took on a team called the Italian All-Stars in Vicenza, Italy. Samuelson repeated her scoring performance with 23 points, while freshman Walker was the leading rebounder with nine. Dangerfield had 88 assist with no turnovers. Samuelson scored 15 of her points in the first quarter, helping the team to a 17-point lead — the team then continued on to a 103–45 victory.

Celje 
The final exhibition game was held in Trieste against Celje, a Slovenian women's basketball club. UConn held a slim lead at halftime 37 – 36, playing without Collier who had injured her ankle in the prior game. However, in the third quarter the Huskies were outscored 25–10 and ended up losing the game 79–59. Samuelson was the high scorer with 17 points but only hit one of her 6 3-point attempts. The Huskies hit just 32% of their field-goal attempts.

Fort Hays State 
UConn took on Division II Fort Hays State in their first exhibition game at home. The starters were the four returning starters from the previous year plus Dangerfield. Stevens came in off the bench and recorded 15 points and four blocked shots in the game. Nurse was the leading scorer with 19 points, while both Williams and Collier had nine rebounds each. UConn won the game easily 82–37.

Ashland University 
The final exhibition game was against Division II Ashland University, who won the Division II national championship in the prior year and came into the season with a longest winnings streak in the country at 37 games. Both teams were ranked number one in the preseason polls. Ashland's Laina Snyder had a double double with 12 points and 10 rebounds while Julie Whorley led the team in scoring with 17 points. For the Huskies, nurse led all scorers with 21 points hitting all of her seven shots from the field. Stevens and Williams each had double doubles, with Stevens scoring 16 points and pulling down 11 rebounds while Williams had 11 points and 10 rebounds. UConn won the game 119–56.

Regular season

Stanford 
The UConn team opened their season on the road, playing in the Countdown to Columbus doubleheader against 10th-ranked Stanford. The Huskies had the good fortune to return three first-team All-American's (the only team in Division I women's basketball to do so this year). The fourth starter for the team, Nurse, was the starting guard on the Canadian Olympic team. The fifth starter was sophomore Dangerfield who had a good but uneven freshman year. However, she reached double figures in scoring halfway through the first quarter, and ended up hitting six of seven 3-point shot attempts. The Huskies opened up a 49–14 halftime lead. For the first time in four years, the opening game did not follow a successful national championship bid, so the team potentially could interrupt their back-to-back winning streak extending from 1993–94. That streak was never seriously threatened in this game is UConn ended up with the win 78–53. It was the 22nd consecutive year that UConn has won their opening game.

California 
UConn played their home opener against 20th-ranked California. The Golden Bears led 4–3 early, but scored 23 of the next 25 points to take control of the game. The Huskies had a 19-point lead at the end of the first quarter, and cruised to an 82–47 win. The team unveiled a banner to honor Rebecca Lobo before the game to reflect her inclusion in the Naismith Hall of Fame in September. Dangerfield, Collier and Nurse shared scoring honors with 14 points each.

Maryland 
The Huskies played their second home game of the season and their first home game at the XL Center against 15th ranked Maryland. UConn's best shooter Samuelson had injured her foot in the prior game and was not able to play. Despite that every starter for UConn scored in double figures led by nurse with 21 points. It was the first start for Azure Stevens who had transferred to UConn from Duke and sat out the prior season. She had a double double with 18 points and 12 rebounds. The game was tied early at seven points apiece but the Huskies went on a 19–2 run to take control. Both teams struggled with ball control, combining for 45 turnovers. The final score, in favor of the Huskies was 97–72.

UCLA 
UConn headed west to play UCLA, a team near Samuelson's hometown of Huntington Beach, but unfortunately her foot injury prevented her from playing. She is no longer on crutches and wearing a walking boot which she could be seen wearing along the sidelines shouting encouragement to her teammates. Despite playing the number five ranked team in the country, her teammates responded, opening up a 24-point lead at one point and ending with a 78–60 win over the Bruins. The audience of over 9000 included Kobe Bryant and Ann Myers Drysdale.

Michigan State 
The Huskies headed north on the next step in their West Coast trip to Matthew Knight Arena in Eugene, Oregon to take place part in the Nike PK80 invitational. They took on Michigan State, their first unranked opponent of the season, but a team with a 4 and 1 record. Stevens, who felt she had not performed well against UCLA, stepped up with 25 points, 16 rebounds and five assists to help UConn to a 96–62 win. She also reached the thousand point mark for her career, with 938 scored at Duke. UConn held the Spartans to just over 34% shooting from the field and dominated on the boards a rebounding Michigan State 46–18.

Nevada 
UConn had never played the University of Nevada, so the game played at the Lawlor Events Center in Reno was the first time on the court for most players on the team. However, it was familiar ground for Williams, who led her high schools team to the state title in 2012 in that arena. She also spent time in the arena watching her father and her sister who both played basketball for Nevada. The game was set up as a homecoming game for the senior Williams. She scored 18 points although her coach Auriemma emphasizes her defensive prowess. Stevens had a double double with 17 points and 14 rebounds but the offensive star of the team was Nurse, scoring on all eight of her three-point attempts, and ending up with 27 points. It was the first ever nationally televised game for Nevada. UConn won 88–57.

Notre Dame 
The game against the third-ranked and undefeated Notre Dame was highly anticipated, resulting in a sellout for the XL center. Connecticut lead at the end of the first quarter by four points, but the Irish responded with a 24–4 run to take a seven-point lead into halftime. The third quarter was close but Notre Dame extended the lead by a single point to enter the fourth quarter with an eight-point lead. UConn's  Samuelson had missed the prior for gains with the foot injury but was able to play in this game until the early in the fourth quarter when she reaggravated her foot injury and had to leave the game. Williams was battling migraines, and ineffective in the first half when she scored only two points on one of seven shooting and did not play the second half. Despite missing two of the top players, UConn outscored Notre Dame 26-9 and the fourth quarter, ending up with 80–71 victory. Five Huskies scored in double digits. Despite missing most of the fourth quarter Samuelson was leading scorer with 18 followed closely by Stevens with 17.

DePaul 
DePaul chose to have the official opening of their new Wintrust Arena on the night that UConn came to town. The Huskies quickly quashed any notion that the Blue Demons would christen their new arena with a win. Really in the game, UConn went on a 14–2 run, aided by back-to-back three-pointers from Dangerfield to set the tone for the game. Samuelson was cleared to play what started off slowly missing several over early shots but she ended up hitting half of her field-goal attempts to lead the Huskies with 20 points. It was not a one-person show as six different players scored in double figures. Collier had a double double with 17 points and 10 rebounds. The final score in favor of the Huskies was 103 – 69.

Oklahoma 
UConn faced Oklahoma in a game technically on a neutral court, as it was neither the home court for Connecticut nor Oklahoma but playing in the Hall of Fame women's Holiday Showcase in Uncasville, Connecticut felt like a home game. The game itself almost seem like an afterthought, as it represented 1000 wins for head coach Geno Auriemma, but Oklahoma tried to spoil the celebration. The Huskies had a 15-point lead at halftime – the Sooners cut that deficit to seven points midway through the third quarter when Connecticut responded with a 13–3 run to build the lead back to 17 points. After the final gun sounded on the 88–64 win the celebration began. Auriemma was treated to tributes from former players and a Hall of Fame jacket as well as a cake, but he wasn't expecting to see many members of his inaugural 1985 team in attendance.

The win moved Auriemma into company with two other women's basketball coaches who have reached the thousand win mark. Two of those coaches are Pat Summitt and Tara VanDerveer. In an odd coincidence, the third member of the club, Sylvia Hatchell, reached the milestone a few hours earlier. Auriemma reached the milestone faster than any other coach doing so with only 135 losses.

Duquesne 
UConn continued its tradition of scheduling a game near the hometown of seniors by playing Duquesne in Toronto, as a homecoming game for Nurse who is from Hamilton, Ontario. The game was a sellout, held at the Mattamy Athletic Centre. Nurse hit 9 of 11 field-goal attempts to score 24 points for the Huskies. It was not the first time that Nurse had played in this arena. She played there previously while in high school and when playing for the Canadian National Team when she led the team to a win over the US in the Pan American games. However, it was the first time her grandparents had watched her play wearing a Connecticut jersey. Samuelson scored 33 points as the Huskies won the game 104–52.

Memphis 
UConn opened conference play with the game against Memphis on the day before New Year's. The start time was 1:30 PM, and the early start made it easy for fans to make it to the game. Just over 12,000, the largest crowd of the year, attended the game. Williams took ten shots and hit every one of them to score 20 points. Although Memphis had come into this game with a four-game winning streak, the Huskies won 97–49. They have now won every single one of their 83 conference games.

East Carolina 
One game after hitting 10 consecutive shots, Williams hit her first six shots and ended up hitting eight of nine against East Carolina. Samuelson recorded nine assists which matched a career-high and Stevens recorded 16 rebounds to also tie a career-high. Heather Macy, the coach of East Carolina said "UConn dominated every facet". UConn held the Lady Pirates to 25% shooting from the field and won the game 96–35.

South Florida 
Connecticut played the first two games against South Florida with this one played on the Bulls home court. The UConn offense was solid with Collier heading 12 of 15 field-goal attempts to record a season-high 25 points. The team hit 50% of their field-goal attempts and reached 100 points for the third time this season. However, the real key to the win was the Huskies defense. USF's Kitija Laksa Is the second leading scorer in the conference averaging over 20 points a game, but she was held to zero points. The team as a whole hit under 30% of their field-goal attempts. The final score, in favor of the Huskies, was 100–49.

UCF 
UConn started out very slowly against Central Florida. The Huskies had a 13-point lead at halftime but the 32 points scored in the first half is the lowest scoring first half the season. The Knights physical defense was effective in slowing down Connecticut and coach Auriemma spent nearly the entire halftime explaining this to the team. They did not return to the court until there were less than 30 seconds left before the start of the third quarter. Whatever was said was effective as UConn scored 48 points in the second half. Stevens came off the bench to record 19 points to lead the Huskies in  scoring. Auriemma praised Williams for "energizing the team in the second half". Her 13 rebounds and five assists help the Huskies in their third quarter run. The final score in favor of Connecticut was 80–44.

Houston 
Connecticut's defense helped UConn to a 95–35 win over Houston. The Huskies held the Cougars to four points in the first quarter into a season-low 20% shooting percentage for the game. The Huskies were also strong offensively with Stevens recording a double double (19 points and 10 rebounds), and Samuelson a nurse each scoring 17 points. The victory represented the 145th consecutive victory over and unranked opponent.

Texas 
UConn found itself in unusual territory – down by double digits in the first quarter. The Longhorns opened up with an 8–2 run to start the game, and expanded the lead to 10 points with the score 22–12. The Huskies responded, but were still down by three points at the end of the first quarter, the first time they had not held the lead at the end of the first quarter the season. Texas was still leading as the half wound down but Dangerfield stole the ball leading to a Collier basket to give UConn a one-point lead to 39–38. Free throws were critical for the Huskies, who hit their first 15 attempts from the charity stripe. However Samuelson, usually a very solid free-throw shooter, had taken an inadvertent elbow to the eye earlier in the game, and missed two consecutive shots at the line in the final minute with UConn only leading by three points. Dangerfield hit two free  throws with eight seconds left in the game to seal the 75–71 victory over the ninth-ranked Texas.

Tulsa 
UConn hosted Tulsa at home. Although the Huskies were up by 15 points at the end of the first quarter, and had finished the quarter on a 16–0 run, coach Auriemma was so dissatisfied with the play of the team he replaced all the starters with five bench players to start the second quarter. Each team would score 16 points in the second quarter, the first time in 21 quarters against AAC opponents that UConn fails outscore the opposition. The starters returned at the beginning of the third quarter but were able to outscore Tulsa only by two points in that period. Tulsa cut the lead to 10 points with just over five minutes left. Although UConn finished the game with a run to win 78 – 60, Auriemma described the team effort as "the most disgraceful he's seen in the 32 years he has been coaching Connecticut".

Temple 
UConn played Temple in Philadelphia in a game which featured Auriemma's former assistant, Tonya Cardoza, now head coach of the Temple Owls. Samuelson was unable to play due to an ankle injury, but that did not seem to slow down the Huskies, as Walker recorded a career-high 22 points and Nurse led all scorers with 24 points. The Owl's Mia Davis was noteworthy for scoring 19 points, but that was not close to enough, as UConn went on to win 113–57. UConn's coach Auriemma made a point of pulling aside Temple's Tanaya Atkinson and Davis for words of encouragement.

Memphis 
UConn had several players nursing injuries as they visited Memphis, but they were unlikely to elicit any sympathy as the Tigers were only able to dress six players. The Huskies were too much for the Tigers with five players in double figures versus only one for the Tigers. Connecticut won easily 93 – 36.

Tulane 
UConn had typically beaten Tulane by large margins, averaging 44 points in the three meetings before the 18 February 2017 game. However, in the most recent meeting played at Tulane, the game went down to the final possession with Connecticut winning 63 – 60. This meeting would end up more like the previous three than the recent close call, with  UConn winning 98 – 45. UConn was up 53 – 19 at halftime and then the huskies really started to hit their shots going 13 for 14 or almost 93% in the third quarter. Tulane's leading scorer was held to two points. Napheesa Collier was perfect from the field, hitting all six of her shots, one of which was a three pointer. Samuelson led all scorers with 19 points, but she was one of six players with double-digit scoring.

South Carolina 
Facing the defending national champions is always an anticipated game, even when you are currently ranked number one in the nation. Adding the expected capacity crowd of 18,000 which showed up to cheer on the Gamecocks, and this game had the potential of being a close game. Crystal Dangerfield the starting point guard for UConn was also looking forward to playing against a former teammate Tyasha Harris. Both played on the  FIBA U-19 World Cup in Udine, Italy, where they help the USA bring home the silver medal.

South Carolina scored the first basket of the game, but the Huskies responded with a 13 – 2 run, to pull out to a 24 – 16 lead at the end of the first quarter. That the Huskies really poured it on going on a 17 – two run to extend the lead to 23 points. While the crowd was heavily weighted in favor of South Carolina fans, UConn fans were able to make their cheers heard over the silence of the Gamecock fans. The second half is largely more of the same, save a brief 12 – zero run by the South Carolina team but UConn responded and South Carolina never got close of the 24 points the remainder of the game, with UConn winning 83–58.

Cincinnati 
Following the decisive win over South Carolina, Connecticut returned to conference play against Cincinnati at home. The team started slowly, down 11–9 in early going before going on a 23 – 0 run to end the quarter. The game was never close again, as all five Huskies starters scored in double digits with both Stevens and Williams recording double doubles. The team hit 56.5% of the field-goal attempts and went on to win easily 106 – 65.

UCF 
The Huskies were ahead 21–4 at the end of the first quarter. Although UConn would extend the lead in the second quarter, Central Florida outscored Connecticut in the second half. UConn would end up with the win 55 – 37, 55 points is the fewest points scored by the team in six years.

Wichita State 
UConn's game against Wichita State was the first ever meeting between the two opponents. Wichita State had switched from the Missouri Valley conference to the American Athletic Conference in the previous year. The last time Connecticut lost to a first-time opponent was in 1996, before any of the current players were born. However, despite the history, the Shockers were not quite prepared for the Huskies. UConn scored seven points before Wichita State even took a shot, and tightest school record with 41 points in the first quarter. They hit 71.6% of their field goal attempts which was the third best in history and ended up with their 87th consecutive win against a first-time opponent. The final score was 124 – 43. Collier scored 26 points on 11 for 13 shooting.

Louisville 
The Cardinals outscored the Huskies in the third and fourth quarters and were only outscored by two points in the second quarter, but that was not enough to overcome a 24 – 6 margin by the Huskies in the first quarter. Louisville scored the first three points of the quarter but UConn then scored 19 consecutive points. The UConn defense held Louisville 20 points under their scoring average. Samuelson played all 40 minutes, scoring 26 points. Williams also played all 40 minutes and pulled down 15 rebounds.

Temple 
Connecticut had six players in double figures as they easily won their game against Temple 106 – 45. This game represented the 100th win for juniors Samuelson and Collier. Interestingly, the 100th win came in the 101st game. While winning 100 of your 101 games is an NCAA record only tied a record, also held by three other UConn classes.

Tulane 
The Green Wave scored first, hitting a three pointer on the first shot of the game, but the Huskies responded with a 28–4 run. Stevens ended up with 23 points while Collier scored 22. The Huskies recorded nine blocks while cruising to an easy win 91 – 47.

SMU 
In their last regular-season road game, UConn played Southern Methodist University. The Mustangs outscored the Huskies in the fourth quarter, and most of the first quarter. UConn did not take the first lead until just over a minute remained in the first quarter. However, following the first media timeout at which SMU led 12–6, the Huskies scored 43 consecutive points. Only a free-throw with 12 seconds left in the quarter prevented the Mustangs from going scoreless in the second quarter, but it was still the fewest points given up by UConn in a quarter since the format switched to quarters three years ago. Samuelson was the leading scorer for the Huskies with 23 points hitting 5 of 8 three-point attempts. The final score was 80–36 in favor of UConn.

Schedule and results

|-
!colspan=12 style=""| Exhibition

|-
!colspan=12 style=""| Regular season

|-
!colspan=12 style=""|AAC Women's Tournament

|-
!colspan=12 style=""|NCAA Women's Tournament

Source

Rankings

Media
Every single Connecticut game is expected to be televised. Excluding exhibitions, most Connecticut games air on SNY, an ESPN network, or a CBS network. Exhibition games and games that air on SNY are also streamed on Husky Vision. Every game is expected to be broadcast on the UConn IMG Sports Network with an extra audio broadcast being available online to listen to through Husky Vision.

References

UConn Huskies women's basketball seasons
Connecticut
Connect
Connect
Connecticut
NCAA Division I women's basketball tournament Final Four seasons